Lipedema is a condition that is almost exclusively found in women and results in enlargement of both legs due to deposits of fat under the skin. Women of any weight may develop lipedema and the fat associated with lipedema is resistant to traditional weight-loss methods. There is no cure and typically it gets worse over time, pain may be present, and patients bruise easily. Over time mobility may be reduced, and due to reduced quality of life, patients often experience depression. In severe cases the trunk and upper body may be involved. Lipedema is commonly misdiagnosed and is now becoming known as lipoalgia due to there being no edema.

The cause is unknown but is believed to involve genetics and hormonal factors. It often runs in families; having a family member with the condition is a risk factor for developing it. Other conditions that may present similarly include lipohypertrophy, chronic venous insufficiency, and lymphedema. It is estimated to affect up to 11% of women. Onset is typically during puberty, pregnancy, or menopause.

The fat associated with lipedema is shown to be resistant to weight loss methods; however, unlike other fat, lipedema is not associated with increased risks of diabetes or cardiovascular disease. Physiotherapy may help to preserve mobility for a little longer than would otherwise be the case. Exercise, only as much as the patient is able to do without causing damage to the joints, may help with overall fitness but will not prevent progression of the disease. Compression stockings can help with pain and make walking easier. Regularly moisturising with emollients protects the skin and prevents it from drying out. Liposuction to remove the fat can help if the symptoms are particularly severe. While surgery can remove fat tissue it can also damage lymphatic vessels. Treatment does not typically result in complete resolution.

Presentation

Associated conditions

Depression and anxiety are very common for a variety of reasons, particularly the fact that diagnosis usually takes a long time and patients have received much advice on diet and exercise in the meantime, neither of which are effective treatment for the lipedema although they may help associated conditions. Joint pain, arthritis, dry skin, fungal infections, cellulitis and slow wound healing are also associated with lipedema.

Diagnosis

Differential diagnosis

Lipedema stages
Lipedema is classified by stage:
Stage 1: Normal skin surface with enlarged hypodermis (lipedema fat).
Stage 2: Uneven skin with indentations in fat and larger hypodermal masses (lipomas).
Stage 3: Bulky extrusions of skin and fat cause large deformations especially on the thighs and around the knees. These large extrusions of tissue drastically inhibit mobility.

Similar conditions
Lipedema is often underdiagnosed due to the difficulty in differentiating it from lymphedema, obesity, or other edemas.

Lipo-lymphedema
Lipo-lymphedema, a secondary lymphedema, is associated with both lipedema and obesity (which occur together in the majority of cases), most often lipedema stages 2 and 3.

Dercum's disease
Lipedema / Dercum's disease differentiation – these conditions may co-exist. Dercum's disease is a syndrome of painful growths in subcutaneous fat. Unlike lipedema, which occurs primarily in the trunk and legs, the fatty growths can occur anywhere on the body.

Treatment
A number of treatments may be useful including physiotherapy and light exercise which does not put undue stress on the lymphatic system. The two most common conservative treatments are manual lymphatic drainage (MLD) where a therapist gently opens lymphatic channels and moves the lymphatic fluid using hands-on techniques, and compression garments that keep the fluid at bay and assist the sluggish lymphatic flow.

The use of surgical techniques is not universal but research has shown positive results in both short-term and long-term studies regarding lymph-sparing liposuction and lipectomy.

The studies of highest quality involve tumescent local anesthesia (TLA), often referred to as simply tumescent liposuction. This can be accomplished via both Suction-Assisted Liposuction (SAL) and Power-Assisted (vibrating) liposuction. The treatment of lipedema with tumescent liposuction may require multiple procedures. While many health insurance carriers in the United States do not reimburse for liposuction for lipedema, in 2020 several carriers regard the procedure as reconstructive and medically necessary and do reimburse. Water Assisted Liposuction (WAL) is technically not considered to be tumescent but achieves the same goal as the anesthetic solution is injected as part of the procedure rather than before-hand. Developed by Doctor Ziah Taufig from Germany, it is usually performed under general anesthesia and is also considered to be lymph-sparing and protective of other tissues such blood vessels.

Prognosis
There is no cure. Complications include a malformed appearance, reduced functionality (mobility and gait), poor quality of life (QOL), depression, anxiety, and pain.

Epidemiology
According to an epidemiologic study by Földi E and Földi M, lipedema affects 11% of the female population, although rates from 6-39% have also been reported.

History
Lipedema was first identified in the United States, at the Mayo Clinic, in 1940. Most attribute the original identification of lipedema to E. A. Hines and L. E. Wold (1951). In spite of that, lipedema is barely known in the United States to physicians or to the patients who have the disease. Lipedema often is confused with obesity or lymphedema, and a significant number of patients currently diagnosed as obese are believed to have lipedema, either instead of or in addition to obesity.

See also
 Lymphedema
 Steatopygia
 Adiposis dolorosa
 Lipodystrophy

References

External links 

Diseases of veins, lymphatic vessels and lymph nodes
Women's health
Medical controversies